Scodie may refer to:
Scodie, California, former name of Onyx, California
Scodie Mountains